George E. Lane is a British historian and author.

After "many years living and working in the Middle East and Asia", Lane began studying at the School of Oriental and African Studies (SOAS) in 1991. He earned a bachelor's degree in history and Persian in 1994, a master's degree in history in 1996, and a PhD in history in 2001. He is a senior teaching fellow in History of the Middle East and Central Asia at the SOAS.

Books
Early Mongol Rule in Thirteenth-Century Iran: A Persian Renaissance (Routledge, 2003)
Genghis Khan and Mongol Rule (Greenwood, 2004)
Daily Life in the Mongol Empire (Greenwood, 2006)
The Mongols in Iran: Qutb Al-Din Shirazi's Akhbar-i Moghulan (translated and edited, Routledge, 2018)
The Phoenix Mosque and the Persians of Medieval Hangzhou (edited, Gingko Library, 2018)
A Short History of the Mongols (IB Tauris, 2018)

References

External links
 George Lane at SOAS Research Online

21st-century British historians
Year of birth missing (living people)
Living people
Place of birth missing (living people)
Academics of SOAS University of London